PBX/Knotted 1 Homeobox 2 (PKNOX2) protein belongs to the three amino acid loop extension (TALE) class of homeodomain proteins, and is encoded by PKNOX2 gene in humans. The protein regulates the transcription of other genes and affects anatomical development.

Function 
PKNOX2 protein regulates expression of other genes by binding to DNA in a sequence-specific manner, i.e. to specific DNA sequences. It binds to unique DNA recognition motifs, acting as a nuclear transcription factor. The nuclear transcription factor is a protein that regulates transcription of genetic information from DNA to messenger RNA. Other functions of PKNOX2 include actin filament binding. An important paralog of the PKNOX2 gene is PKNOX1.

Structure 
PKNOX2 belongs to the three amino acid loop extension (TALE) class of homeodomain proteins. This class is characterized by a 3-amino acid extension between alpha helix 1 and 2 in the homeodomain.

Homeodomain proteins are sequence-specific transcription factors that share a highly conserved DNA binding domain and play a crucial role in cell proliferation, differentiation and death.

Clinical significance 
In a 2014 review article of the genome-wide association findings of alcohol dependence, the researchers concluded that based on functional analysis (demonstration of a cause-effect relation), genetic variants related to the PKNOX2 gene may play a role in alcohol dependence risk, albeit a minor role comparing to the role played by the genes located in the alcohol dehydrogenase cluster.

See also
 Homeobox
 Binding to specific DNA sequences

References 

Transcription factors